The Swedish Tank Museum Arsenalen (Försvarsfordonsmuseet Arsenalen) is a museum specializing in armoured fighting vehicles that opened on 17 June 2011. It is located about 6 km from Strängnäs, Södermanland, Sweden. There are 75 vehicles on site in the museum and the museum owns 375 vehicles. The Museum is operated by a private, non-profit foundation.

Exhibits
The Vehicle Hall is the main building containing vehicles, simulator, Figure Museum, and temporary exhibits.

Vehicles
Vehicles at the museum include:
Centurion (tank)

Stridsvagn 103 (S-Tank)
FM43 Self-propelled anti-aircraft weapon
Pansarbandvagn 301
Stridsvagn m/40

References

External links
Swedish Tank Museum Arsenalen website (English)

Tank museums
Museums in Södermanland County
Military and war museums in Sweden
Strängnäs Municipality